Heinz Hasselberg (19 January 1914 – 31 May 1989) was a German cyclist. He competed in the team pursuit event at the 1936 Summer Olympics.

References

External links
 

1914 births
1989 deaths
German male cyclists
Olympic cyclists of Germany
Cyclists at the 1936 Summer Olympics
Sportspeople from Bochum
Cyclists from North Rhine-Westphalia
20th-century German people